Non serviam is Latin for "I will not serve". The phrase is traditionally attributed to Satan, who is thought to have spoken these words as a refusal to serve God in heaven.  

Today "non serviam" is also used or referred to as motto by a number of political, cultural, and religious groups to express their wish to rebel; it may be used to express a radical view against established common beliefs and organisational structures accepted as the status quo.

Use
In the Latin Vulgate, Jeremiah laments that the people of Israel speak "non serviam" to express their rejection of God. This is the only appearance of the phrase in the Vulgate.

In James Joyce's A Portrait of the Artist as a Young Man, Stephen Dedalus says "I will not serve that in which I no longer believe whether it call itself my home, my fatherland or my church: and I will try to express myself in some mode of life or art as freely as I can and as wholly as I can, using for my defence the only arms I allow myself to use – silence, exile, and cunning." In a climactic moment of Ulysses, Dedalus is confronted in a brothel by an apparition of his dead mother, urging him to repent and avoid "the fire of hell." He cries out "Ah non, par exemple! The intellectual imagination! With me all or not at all. Non serviam! (...) No! No! No! Break my spirit all of you if you can! I'll bring you all to heel!" 

In modern times, "non serviam" has developed into a general phrase used to express radical, sometimes even revolutionary rejection of conformity, not necessarily limited to religious matters and as expressed in modern literary adaptations of the motto.

Non Serviam was the third single released from Frank Turner's No. 1 Album FTHC.

Scriptural discussion
The original Hebrew phrase is לֹא אֶעֱבֹד (Lô´ ´e`ĕvôd), where it appears in a jeremiad against Israel, accusing them of refusing to serve God. Some English language Bibles may translate "non serviam" as "I will not transgress"; this seems to be an alternative reading of certain manuscripts. This is most likely a scribal error because the difference between "serve" (עבד) and "transgress" (עבר) in late Hebrew characters is so minute that it would be easy to mistake one for the other when hand-copying a manuscript. Most modern literal translations (such as the Revised Standard Version) choose "serve" over "transgress" as the proper reading because the context calls for a statement of disobedience, not of obedience.

References

External links
A Latin Vulgate
Jeremiah 2:20

Latin religious words and phrases
Cultural depictions of the Devil
Authority
Rebellion
Disobedience